Tiemen Wijnen (born 2 May 2000) is a Belgian footballer who plays for Belisia Bilzen.

Club career
He made his Eerste Divisie debut for Roda JC Kerkrade on 30 November 2018 in a game against TOP Oss as a 89th-minute substitute for Nicky Souren.

References

External links
 

2000 births
Living people
Belgian footballers
Belgian expatriate footballers
Belgium youth international footballers
Association football midfielders
Roda JC Kerkrade players
Eerste Divisie players
Belgian expatriate sportspeople in the Netherlands
Expatriate footballers in the Netherlands